Rumah Pemlu is the Indonesian flagship news program which broadcast on Kompas TV. This program is about elections for president of parliament at various levels of government.

History 
Through from program the "Rumah Pemilu" (English: "House of Elections") Kompas TV will be one of the moments awaited by the people of Indonesia. The simultaneous elections, legislative elections, and presidential elections will become the nation's new historical record. Rumah Pemilu 2019, readers have a basis for consideration to determine their political choices in a five-yearly democratic party

Portal news 
Kompas Gramedia launched the official website about the 2019 election on www.rumahpemilu.id

References

External links 

Indonesian-language television shows
Indonesian television shows
2018 Indonesian television series debuts
2010s Indonesian television series
2018 establishments in Indonesia
Kompas TV

Kompas TV original programming